The Ministry of Justice is the Aruban Ministry responsible for justice, imprisonment and public security. The Ministry was created in 1986, following Aruba's Status aparte" Per an ordinance passed in 2002, the ministry is organized as follows 

 The Directorate of Judicial Affairs.
 The Support Office.
 The Executive Services
The Attorney General's Office 
The Registry of the Common Courts of the Netherlands Antilles and Aruba. 

The Attorney General serves as the legal adviser to the Minister of Justice.

List of Ministers of Justice

See also 

 Justice ministry
 Politics of Aruba

References 

Justice ministries
Government of Aruba